"Vampires" is a song by American rock band Godsmack. It appeared as the ninth track on the band's second studio album, Awake, in 2000. "Vampires" is a spoken word song with some dialogue from a television show named Mysterious Forces Beyond. The song received a Grammy nomination for "Best Rock Instrumental" in 2001.

In 2002, lead singer Sully Erna reflected on the song's Grammy nomination:
"I don't even know why we were nominated, because we were in a category with Joe Satriani and these other guys for best instrumental performance. And the instrumental that we had on our record was an accident, so that was pretty bizarre to be nominated for that."

The song is written by Sully Erna and Robbie Merrill.

Personnel

 Sully Erna – guitar
 Tony Rombola – guitar
 Robbie Merrill – bass
 Tommy Stewart – drums

References

2000 songs
Godsmack songs
Songs about vampires
Songs written by Sully Erna
Songs written by Robbie Merrill